Katharine Alice Salvin Tristram (29 April 1858 – 24 August 1948) was a missionary and teacher in Japan with the Church Missionary Society. She was also the first resident lecturer at Westfield College and one of the first women to gain a degree from the University of London. She was the first woman missionary with the Church Missionary Society to have a degree.

Family and education
Katharine Tristram was born on 29 April 1858 in Castle Eden, co. Durham, the fifth child of the Revd. Henry Baker Tristram (1822–1906), canon of Durham, and his wife, Eleanor Mary (d. 1903), daughter of Captain P. Bowlby. She was educated at Cheltenham Ladies' College.

Her sister was also active in the missionary cause, as a fundraiser and a writer for the Church Missionary Intelligencer.

Career
In 1882 Katharine Tristram was appointed as the first resident lecturer at Westfield College, under its first principal, Constance Maynard.

In 1888 Tristram left Westfield to go out to Japan as a CMS missionary. She joined the staff of the Eisei Girls’ School, which had been taken over by the Church Missionary Society. After passing an examination in Japanese she became headmistress of the school in January 1890. In March 1890 the school became the Bishop Poole Memorial Girls’ School, named after Arthur William Poole, the first English bishop in Japan. Her mission was to convert the students in her care and she was ambitious that the students would become missionaries themselves. She also oversaw an improvement in the academic standards of the school.
In 1891 Japan was hit by an earthquake. Tristram and other missionaries visited the disaster zone to provide aid to the injured and dying.

Tristram remained in Japan until 1938. In 1891 her father visited her, but apart from this she saw friends and family only on occasional home furloughs. She sometimes took advantages of these furloughs to enjoy walking holidays with her old College friend, Alice Hodgekin.

Tristram maintained a relationship with Westfield College, writing back to Constance Maynard often. She also wrote articles for the College newsletter about missionary life and Japanese customs, and arranged a scheme in which Westfield students sponsored a Japanese student as the ‘Westfield Scholar’.

Later life
Tristram retired from Bishop Poole School in 1927 but remained in Tokyo until 1938, when life became more difficult for British and American missionaries in Japan - in part because of the outbreak of war with China in 1937. She died at Brislington House, Bristol, on 24 August 1948.

References

External links
Mundus database provides information on the location of Tristram's papers
Queen Mary Archives pages includes links to digitised material on Constance Maynard

Women educators
Female Christian missionaries
English Anglican missionaries
Academics of Westfield College
Missionary educators
1858 births
1948 deaths
Women school principals and headteachers
British expatriates in Japan